Gladys Shirley Eastlake Smith (14 August 1883 – 18 September 1941), also known as Gwendoline Eastlake-Smith and Gladys Lamplough (after her marriage),  was a British tennis player. She won an Olympic gold medal at the 1908 Summer Olympics in London.

Early life
Born as Gladys Shirley Eastlake Smith in Sydenham, Lewisham, Kent on 14 August 1883, she was the daughter of Charles Eastlake Smith and Lizzie Smith (née Cooper). Her father had played football for England in 1876.

Tennis career
She won the All England covered mixed doubles in 1905 with Reginald Doherty. She won the Monte Carlo Championships in 1906, 1907 and 1908, won the London Covered Court Championships ladies singles in October 1906 and April 1907, and reached the final in October 1907.  She won the All England covered mixed doubles a second time in 1908 with Anthony Wilding.  The same year, she won the Women's indoor singles at the Olympic Games in London.  She beat fellow Briton Violet Pinkney 7–5, 7–5 in the quarter-finals; Swede Elsa Wallenberg 6–4, 6–4 in the semi-finals; and fellow Briton Alice Greene 6–2, 4–6, 6–0 in the final.

Two days after winning the Olympic final, she married Wharram Lamplough a physician and surgeon. She reached the semi-finals in the ladies singles at Wimbledon, under her married name, in 1908 and 1910, and won the ladies singles at Queen's in 1910.  She won the "Married Doubles" in 1913 with her husband.  She last competed in the ladies singles at Wimbledon in 1921.

References

External links
 
 in Lawn Tennis for Ladies, by Mrs. Lambert Chambers, 1910, from Project Gutenberg.
Biography from the British Olympic Association
Olympic medal winnders, 1896-1996, from The Times

1883 births
1941 deaths
English female tennis players
English Olympic medallists
Olympic gold medallists for Great Britain
Olympic tennis players of Great Britain
People from Lewisham
Tennis players at the 1908 Summer Olympics
Olympic medalists in tennis
Medalists at the 1908 Summer Olympics
British female tennis players
Tennis people from Greater London